United Nations Security Council resolution 1191, adopted unanimously on 27 August 1998, after recalling resolutions 808 (1993), 827 (1993) and 1166 (1998), the Council forwarded a list of nine nominations for judges at the International Criminal Tribunal for the former Yugoslavia (ICTY) to the General Assembly for consideration.

The list of nominations received by the Secretary-General Kofi Annan by 4 August 1998 was as follows:

 Mohamed Bennouna (Morocco)
 David Hunt (Australia)
 Per-Johan Lindholm (Finland)
 Hugo Anibal Llanos Mansilla (Chile)
 Patrick Robinson (Jamaica)
 S.W.B. Vadugodapitiya (Sri Lanka)
 Luis Valencia-Rodríguez (Ecuador)
 Jan Skupinski (Poland)
 Peter Wilkitzki (Germany)

The General Assembly later elected Mohamed Bennouna, David Hunt and Patrick Robinson to serve in the third chamber at the ICTY in October 1998.

See also
 List of United Nations Security Council Resolutions 1101 to 1200 (1997–1998)
 Yugoslav Wars

References

External links
 
Text of the Resolution undocs.org

 1191
 1191
1998 in Yugoslavia
 1191
August 1998 events